The Deep Blue Sea film series consists of American science fiction natural-horror films, centered around genetically enhanced-sharks. The overall plot of the series centers around scientific studies conducted by marine biologists. These experiments provide the predatory animals with heightened intelligence, inadvertently causing the sharks to attack the underwater facilities and hunt the researchers that created them.
Director Renny Harlin had become well known for bringing stylish action sequences into his films, but he also was noted for pushing the boundaries of effects work. This was evident in his earliest forays into horror with A Nightmare on Elm Street 4: The Dream Master. For Deep Blue Sea, Harlin employed animatronics wizard Walt Conti and his company Edge Innovations (which previously worked on Anaconda), to create the most lifelike on-screen shark puppets at that point in time.

The first film was released in theaters in 1999 and was a box office success, though it received mixed reviews from film critics. Over time Deep Blue Sea has been labeled a cult classic by audience and critics alike. After years of being in development hell, a sequel was released straight-to-home video and VOD services in 2018. While initially debuting at No. 8 on the Top 20 Sellers for the week ended April 21, 2018 and being on-par with theatrical releases,  Deep Blue Sea 2 was panned by critics. Deep Blue Sea 3 was released on July 28, 2020 through video on demand.

Films

Deep Blue Sea (1999)

 
On an island research facility, Dr. Susan McAlester is conducting experiments to cure Alzheimer's disease, by harvesting the brain tissue of DNA-altered mako sharks. When the facility's benefactors send a company executive to investigate the under-water facility, a routine procedure is disrupted after a shark attacks the researchers.

During the attack the protective glass, keeping the ocean outside of the building, is fractured. As the security systems begins to enter lockdown as a safety procedure, the enhanced sharks make their way into the outpost with the incoming water. Now, with sharks outnumbering their human captors, McAlester and her team must figure out a way to stop the hyper-intelligent sharks from escaping to the ocean, which would lead to the altered species reproducing. Together the group fights for survival, racing against the clock, while being hunted by the predatory animals.

Deep Blue Sea 2 (2018)

A shark conservation biologist named Dr. Misty Calhoun, is hired in a consultory position for a non-public confidential project involving genetically-enhanced bull sharks. Funded by a pharmaceutical billionaire with questionable ethics, the mogul plans to medically market intelligence. During a routine procedure, the sharks begin attacking the researchers and initiate security shutdown, causing mass flooding throughout the establishment. As the scientists fight for survival and race to the surface, the enhanced-sharks begin to hunt them.

Deep Blue Sea 3 (2020)

In August 2019, it was announced that a third film tentatively titled Deep Blue Sea 3 was in development, with intentions to serve as a Netflix exclusive film. By May 2020, it was revealed that the film had finished production within the last year, with principal photography taking place in Cape Town of the Republic of South Africa. John Pogue serves as director, with a script by Dirk Blackman, while Hunt Lowry and Patty Reed serve as producers.

The plot centers around Dr. Emma Collins, who leads a team at a small island studying the effects of climate change on great white sharks. The study is disrupted when her marine biologist ex-boyfriend named Richard arrives, searching for some enhanced-bull sharks. The film attained an R rating for "violence, bloody images, and language". The project was distributed by Warner Bros. Home Entertainment. The film was released on July 28, 2020 on video on demand, and on August 25, 2020 for home video.

Main cast and characters

Additional crew and production details

Reception

Box office

Critical and public response

References 

Horror film series
Film series introduced in 1999
Warner Bros. Pictures franchises